All Saints' Episcopal Church built in 1881 is a historic Episcopal church building located in Valley City, Barnes County, North Dakota. Designed in the Late Gothic Revival style of architecture by an unknown architect, it was built of local fieldstone with concrete mortar and a wooden shake roof. It is noted as the "first stone Episcopal church [built] in North Dakota."  On December 3, 1992, it was added to the National Register of Historic Places as part of the Episcopal Churches of North Dakota Multiple Property Submission.

All Saints is still a small but active parish in the Episcopal Diocese of North Dakota.

References

Churches on the National Register of Historic Places in North Dakota
Episcopal church buildings in North Dakota
Stone churches in North Dakota
Gothic Revival church buildings in North Dakota
Churches completed in 1881
19th-century Episcopal church buildings
National Register of Historic Places in Barnes County, North Dakota
1881 establishments in Dakota Territory